James FitzJames Butler, 2nd Duke of Ormonde,  (1665–1745) was an Irish statesman and soldier. He was the third of the Kilcash branch of the family to inherit the earldom of Ormond. Like his grandfather, the 1st Duke, he was raised as a Protestant, unlike his extended family who held to Roman Catholicism. He served in the campaign to put down the Monmouth Rebellion, in the Williamite War in Ireland, in the Nine Years' War and in the War of the Spanish Succession but was accused of treason and went into exile after the Jacobite rising of 1715.

Birth and origins 
James was born on 29 April 1665 at Dublin Castle. He was the second but eldest surviving son of Thomas Butler by his wife Emilia van Nassau-Beverweerd. His father was known as Lord Ossory. He was heir apparent of James Butler, 1st Duke of Ormond but predeceased him and so never became duke. His father's family, the Butler dynasty, was Old English and descended from Theobald Walter, who had been appointed Chief Butler of Ireland by King Henry II in 1177. James's mother was Dutch. She descended from a cadet branch of the House of Nassau. Both parents were Protestant. They married on 17 November 1659.

They had eleven children.

Early life 
He was educated in France and afterwards at Christ Church, Oxford. On the death of his father on 30 July 1680 he became Baron Butler in the English peerage and the 7th Earl of Ossory in the Irish Peerage.

Early military career 

He obtained command of a cavalry regiment in Ireland in 1683, and having received an appointment at court on the accession of James II, he served against the Duke of Monmouth at the Battle of Sedgemoor in July 1685. Having succeeded his grandfather as 2nd Duke of Ormonde on 21 July 1688, he was appointed a Knight of the Order of the Garter on 28 September 1688. In 1688 he also became Chancellor of Trinity College, Dublin and Chancellor of the University of Oxford.

In January and February 1689 he voted against the motion to put William of Orange and Mary on the throne and against the motion to declare that James II had abdicated it. Nevertheless, he subsequently joined the forces of William of Orange, by whom he was made colonel of the Queen's Troop of Horse Guards on 20 April 1689. He accompanied William in his Irish campaign, debarking with him in Carrickfergus on 14 June 1690 and commanded this troop at the Battle of the Boyne in July 1690. In February 1691 he became Lord Lieutenant of Somerset.

He served on the continent under William of Orange during the Nine Years' War and, having been promoted to major-general, he fought at the Battle of Steenkerque in August 1692 and the Battle of Landen in July 1693, where he was taken prisoner by the French and then exchanged for the Duke of Berwick, James II's illegitimate son. He was promoted to lieutenant-general in 1694.

After the accession of Queen Anne in March 1702, he became commander of the land forces co-operating with Sir George Rooke in Spain, where he fought in the Battle of Cádiz in August 1702 and the Battle of Vigo Bay in October 1702 during the War of the Spanish Succession (1701–1714). Having been made a Privy Councillor, Ormonde succeeded Lord Rochester as Lord Lieutenant of Ireland in 1703. In 1704 he leased and rebuilt a property that became known as Ormonde Lodge in Richmond outside London.

Following the dismissal of the Duke of Marlborough, Ormonde was appointed Commander-in-Chief of the Forces and colonel of the 1st Regiment of Foot Guards on 4 January 1712 and Captain-General on 26 February 1712. In the Irish Parliament Ormonde and the majority of peers supported the Tory interest.

The Guiscard affair 
He played a dramatic role at the notorious meeting of the Privy Council on 8 March 1711 when Antoine de Guiscard, a French double agent who was being questioned about his treasonable activities, attempted to assassinate Robert Harley, 1st Earl of Oxford, against whom he had a personal grudge for drastically cutting his allowance, by stabbing him with a penknife (how he managed to get into the Council room with a weapon remains a mystery). Harley was wounded, but not seriously, due largely to the fact that he was wearing a heavy gold brocade waistcoat, in which the knife got stuck. Several Councillors, including Ormonde, stabbed Guiscard in return. Guiscard implored Ormonde to finish the deed, but Ormonde replied that it was not for him to play the hangman. In any case, he had the sense to see that Guiscard must be kept alive at least long enough to be questioned, although as it turned out Guiscard's wounds were fatal and he died a week later.

The last campaign 
On 23 April 1712 he left Harwich for Rotterdam to lead the British troops taking part in the war. Once there he allowed himself to be made the tool of the Tory ministry, whose policy was to carry on the war in the Netherlands while giving secret orders to Ormonde to take no active part in supporting their allies under Prince Eugene. In July 1712 Ormonde advised Prince Eugene that he could no longer support the siege of Quesnoy and that he was withdrawing the British troops from the action and instead intended to take possession of Dunkirk. The Dutch were so exasperated at the withdrawal of the British troops that they closed the towns of Bouchain on Douai to British access, despite the fact that they had plenty of stores and medical facilities available. Ormonde took possession of Ghent and Bruges as well as Dunkirk, in order to ensure his troops were adequately provided for. On 15 April 1713 he became Lord Lieutenant of Norfolk.

Jacobite 
Ormonde's position as Captain-General made him a personage of much importance in the crisis brought about by the death of Queen Anne and, during the last years of Queen Anne, Ormonde almost certainly had Jacobite leanings and corresponded with the Jacobite Court including his cousin, Piers Butler, 3rd Viscount Galmoye, who kept barrels of gunpowder at Kilkenny Castle. King George I on his accession to the throne in August 1714 instituted extensive changes and excluded the Tories from royal favour. Ormonde was stripped of his posts as Captain-General, as colonel of the 1st Regiment of Foot Guards and as Commander in Chief of the Forces with the first two posts going to the Duke of Marlborough and the role of Commander-in-Chief going to the Earl of Stair. On 19 November 1714 Ormonde was instead made a member of the reconstituted Privy Council of Ireland.

Accused of supporting the Jacobite rising of 1715, during which the rebels had shouted "High church and Ormond", he was impeached for high treason by Lord Stanhope on 21 June 1715. He might have avoided the impending storm of Parliamentary prosecution, if he had remained in England and stood trial but instead he chose to flee to France in August 1715 and initially stayed in Paris with Lord Bolingbroke. On 20 August 1715 he was attainted, his estate forfeited, and honours extinguished. The Earl Marshal was instructed to remove the names and armorial bearings of Ormonde and Bolingbroke from the list of peers and Ormonde's banner as Knight of the Garter was taken down in St George's Chapel.

On 20 June 1716, the Parliament of Ireland passed an act extinguishing the regalities and liberties of the county palatine of Tipperary; for vesting his estate in the crown and for giving a reward of £10,000 for his apprehension, should he attempt to land in Ireland. But the same parliament passed an act on 24 June 1721, to enable his brother Charles Butler, 1st Earl of Arran, to purchase his estate, which he accordingly did.

Ormonde subsequently moved to Spain where he held discussions with Cardinal Alberoni. He later took part in a Spanish and Jacobite plan to invade England and put James Francis Edward Stuart on the British throne in 1719, but his fleet was disbanded by a storm in the Bay of Biscay. In 1732 he moved to Avignon, where he was seen in 1733 by the writer, Lady Mary Wortley Montagu. Ormonde died at Avignon in exile on 16 November 1745, but his body was brought back to London  and buried in Westminster Abbey on 22 May 1746.

Marriage and children 
On 20 July 1682 he, then called Lord Ossory, married Lady Anne Hyde, daughter of Laurence Hyde, who was then Viscount Hyde of Kenilworth but became Earl of Rochester in November. The couple had a daughter, Mary, who died young in 1688.

Following the death of his first wife (which is known to have caused him intense grief) in 1685, Ossory planned to marry again, in order to secure a male heir. He gained permission from the House of Lords for the arranging of a jointure for another marriage in May 1685, and in August of that year, he married Lady Mary Somerset, daughter of the Duke of Beaufort and Mary Capel.  The couple had a son, Thomas (1686–1689), and two daughters, Elizabeth (1689–1750) and Mary (1690–1713). Ormonde's second wife was a lady of the bedchamber to Queen Anne. Their younger daughter, Mary, married John Ashburnham, 1st Earl of Ashburnham.

See also 
List of deserters from James II to William of Orange

Notes and references

Notes

Citations

Sources

Books 

 Barnard, Toby, and Jane Fenlon (eds.) (2000). The Dukes of Ormonde, 1610–1745. Woodbridge: Boydell Press.  
 
 
  – Marriages, baptisms and burials from about 1660 to 1875
  – N to R (for Ormonde)
  (for his father)
  – England (for his sister Elizabeth, cited in this edition because the corresponding page is missing in the 1828 edition.)
  – Scotland and Ireland
 
 

  (for him)
 
  
  – Viscounts (for Ormond under Butler, Viscount Mountgarrett)
  – From the revolution to the death of George II
  – 1713 to 1748
  – 1700 to 1713

London Gazette

Further reading 
 
 
 Murdoch, Tessa (ed.) (2022). Great Irish Households: Inventories from the Long Eighteenth Century. Cambridge: John Adamson, pp. 25–85  .

External links 
 
 

 

 

1665 births
1745 deaths
17th-century Irish people
18th-century Irish people
James
British army commanders in the War of the Spanish Succession
British Army generals
Burials at Westminster Abbey
Chancellors of the University of Dublin
102
Grenadier Guards officers
Irish Jacobites
Irish soldiers in the British Army
Garter Knights appointed by James II
Lord High Constables of England
Lord-Lieutenants of Norfolk
Lord-Lieutenants of Somerset
Lords Lieutenant of Ireland
Lords Warden of the Cinque Ports
Members of the Privy Council of Ireland
People from County Dublin
People expelled from the Privy Council of Great Britain
Protestant Jacobites
Butler